Malephora is a genus of succulent plants in the ice plant family. There are 13 to 17 species in the genus, many of which are known commonly as mesembs. They are native to Africa. 
During the apartheid era, South African scientists have used it to create a chemical poison.

These are perennial herbs used as groundcovers lined with fleshy, smooth, sometimes waxy leaves no more than 6 centimeters long. Leaves are triangular or rounded in cross-section and are arranged oppositely about the stem. The tubular flowers arise from leaf axils or at the ends of stem branches. The flowers may be several centimeters wide. They have up to 65 narrow petals in bright shades of yellow, orange, pink, or purple. The center of the flower has whorls of up to 150 stamens. The fruit is a capsule that opens when it becomes wet, releasing the many seeds.

Some species are used as ornamental plants, particularly Malephora crocea.

Species include:
Malephora crocea - orange flowers
Malephora framesii
Malephora herrei
 Malephora lutea - improper reference to M. luteola
Malephora luteola - Rocky Point ice plant - yellow flowers
Malephora pienaarii
Malephora purpureo-crocea - purple flowers
Malephora smithii

References

External links

Jepson Manual Treatment: Malephora

Aizoaceae
Aizoaceae genera
Taxa named by N. E. Brown